The Madding Crowd is the debut major-label album by the American rock band Nine Days, released on May 16, 2000, by Epic Records. It spawned the major hit "Absolutely (Story of a Girl)" and another single, "If I Am". It peaked at number 67 on the US Billboard 200. The album's title is a reference to Thomas Hardy's 1874 novel Far from the Madding Crowd.

Track listing
 "So Far Away" (Brian Desveaux, John Hampson) – 3:56
 "Absolutely (Story of a Girl)" (Hampson) – 3:09
 "If I Am" (Hampson) – 4:18
 "End Up Alone" (Hampson) – 3:57
 "Sometimes" (Desveaux) – 5:14
 "Bob Dylan" (Desveaux, Bob Dylan) – 4:35
 "257 Weeks" (Hampson) – 4:04
 "Bitter" (Desveaux) – 6:21
 "Back to Me" (Desveaux) – 4:00
 "Crazy" (Desveaux, Hampson) – 4:14
 "Revolve" (Hampson) – 3:54
 "Wanna Be" (Desveaux) – 6:03

Personnel
Jeremy Dean – keyboards
Brian Desveaux – vocals, guitar
Nick Dimichino – bass guitar
John Hampson – vocals, guitar
Vincent Tattanelli – drums

Commercial performance 
"The Madding Crowd" debuted at number 63 on the US Billboard 200. The album was certified Gold in the United States with 500,000 album copies sold.

Charts

Certifications

Demo recordings
In January 2013, upon the relaunch of the band's official website, several old live recordings and demos were made available to the band's fans for the first time. Included among these were the original demos for The Madding Crowd.

These demos were recorded in 1998 and 1999 between the band's independently released album Three and their first mainstream hit, "Absolutely (Story of a Girl)."

 Another Day
 Absolutely
 If I Am
 Too Much Love
 Esteem
 Nobody
 Revolve
 Bring It Back (released as "Sometimes" on the studio release) 
 Day by Daybreak
 Heart Defect
 Side to Side (an early version of "257 Weeks")
 Wanna Be
 That's How You Are

Of the songs included in the demo collection, five were later recorded and included on the actual release of the album in, more or less, an unaltered, though more produced, form. One more track, "Side to Side", carries the same melody and many of the same lyrics as "257 Weeks" but is not completely the same song.

In popular culture 
 "Another Day" was included on the soundtrack of the 2001 film Summer Catch.

See also
 Far from the Madding Crowd

References

2000 albums
Epic Records albums
Nine Days albums